Chalkyitsik Airport  is a state-owned public-use airport serving Chalkyitsik, in the Yukon-Koyukuk Census Area of the U.S. state of Alaska.

Facilities and aircraft 
Chalkyitsik Airport has one runway designated 3/21 with a gravel surface measuring is 4,000 by 90 feet (1,219 x 27 m). For the 12-month period ending December 31, 2005, the airport had 650 aircraft operations, an average of 54 per month: 77% air taxi and 23% general aviation.

Airlines and destinations

Statistics

References

External links
 FAA Alaska airport diagram (GIF)
 

Airports in the Arctic
Airports in the Yukon–Koyukuk Census Area, Alaska